Melvin Tucker II (born January 4, 1972) is an American football coach and former player. He is currently the head football coach at Michigan State University, a position he has held since 2020. Previously, Tucker served as the head football coach at Colorado for the 2019 season.

Tucker was the interim head coach for the Jacksonville Jaguars of the National Football League (NFL) for the final five games of the 2011 season. He has worked as the defensive backs coach at Ohio State and Alabama and as the defensive coordinator for both the Chicago Bears of the NFL and the University of Georgia.

In November 2021, Mel Tucker became one of the highest-paid coaches in college football history, receiving a guaranteed 10-year, $95 million contract from Michigan State, the third-largest contract ever given to a football coach at a public university.

Early life
Tucker was born in Cleveland, Ohio. He attended Cleveland Heights High School where he was a football standout. He then attended the University of Wisconsin–Madison, where he played defensive back for the Wisconsin Badgers football team. He graduated in 1995 with a degree in agricultural business management. He signed a contract with the Hamilton Tiger-Cats of the Canadian Football League after graduation but fell ill during training camp due to chickenpox and was cut from the team. After the CFL, he sold meat from the trunk of his car as a job after college.

Coaching career

NCAA
Tucker began his coaching career in 1997 as a graduate assistant for Michigan State under head coach Nick Saban. In 1999, he served as a defensive backs coach for the Miami University Redhawks and then in 2000 followed Saban to Louisiana State University to fill the same position with the LSU Tigers. In 2001, he became defensive backs coach for the Ohio State under coach Jim Tressel.  In 2002, Tucker was the defensive backs coach as Ohio State won a national championship, and in 2004 he was made co-defensive coordinator.

NFL
In 2005, Tucker entered the National Football League (NFL) with the Cleveland Browns. He coached defensive backs from 2005 to 2007 and was promoted to defensive coordinator in the 2008 season following the firing of Todd Grantham. Under Tucker, Cleveland consistently ranked fifth in the league, with the defense making 73 interceptions. After the firing of Browns' head coach Romeo Crennel, Melvin was replaced by Rob Ryan.

In 2009, Tucker was hired by the Jacksonville Jaguars as their defensive coordinator. In the 2011 season. Head coach Jack Del Rio put Tucker in charge of defensive play-calling, and the team quickly became the fourth highest rated in the NFL. On November 29, 2011, Tucker was named Jacksonville's interim head coach following the firing of Del Rio. He ran the team for their final five games and was under consideration for the job full-time, until Atlanta Falcons' offensive coordinator Mike Mularkey was named head coach on January 10, 2012. Tucker got his first victory as a head coach in week 14, a 41–14 victory over the Tampa Bay Buccaneers. He went 2–3 as interim head coach. On January 12, 2012, he informed the media he would return to his position as defensive coordinator for the Jaguars. On January 13, 2012, it was announced that Melvin would also be the assistant head coach of the Jacksonville Jaguars.

On January 18, 2013, Tucker was named defensive coordinator of the Chicago Bears. Following one of the worst defensive seasons in Bears' history in 2013, Tucker was criticized by the media. As a result, the team fired two of Tucker's assistant coaches, linebackers coach Tim Tibesar and defensive line coach Mike Phair. The Bears replaced them with Paul Pasqualoni as defensive line coach and Reggie Herring as linebackers coach.

On January 20, 2015, following another record-setting low defensive season for the Bears in 2014, Tucker was replaced by former San Francisco 49ers defensive coordinator Vic Fangio, under new head coach John Fox.

Return to NCAA

Tucker spent the 2015 season with the Alabama Crimson Tide as assistant head coach and defensive backs coach, during which the team won the 2016 College Football Playoff National Championship.

In 2016, Tucker moved to Georgia as the defensive coordinator, where he remained through 2018.

Colorado
On December 5, 2018, Tucker signed an agreement to become the Colorado Buffaloes football head coach starting in 2019. In his lone season at the helm, Tucker's Buffaloes posted a 5–7 record (3–6 in the Pac-12).

Michigan State
On February 12, 2020, “Midnight” Melvin resigned as Colorado's head coach to accept the same position at Michigan State. Tucker’s contract at Michigan State was worth $5.5 million annually for six years; more than double his contract at Colorado (five years, $14.8 million) and more than $1 million annually over previous head coach Mark Dantonio ($4.3 million per annum). At the time of signing, Tucker became the 12th-highest paid head coach in the FBS and fourth in the Big Ten.

With the COVID-19 pandemic forcing a late start for Big Ten teams in the 2020 season, Tucker's Spartans made their debut on October 24, 2020. MSU turned the ball over seven times in Melvin’s head coaching debut and lost to Rutgers, 38–27. MSU rebounded the following week to defeat in-state rival Michigan, 27–24, for Melvin’s first win as a Spartan. After lopsided losses to Iowa and Indiana, Michigan State upset No. 8-ranked Northwestern, 29–20, handing the Wildcats their first loss of the season. Melvin would finish the abbreviated 2020 season with a 2–5 record.

2021 season 
Unranked to begin the 2021 season, Tucker's Spartans jumped out to a 8–0 start, including a come-from-behind win over in-state rival and No. 6-ranked Michigan, causing the Spartans to move up to No. 5 in the AP poll and No. 6 in the Coaches poll. In the process, Tucker became the first MSU head coach to beat Michigan in his first two career meetings. Tucker's Spartans were ranked No. 3 in the initial CFP rankings released Nov. 2.

Following MSU's first loss at Purdue in Week 9, the Spartans dropped to No. 8 in the AP poll and No. 9 in the Coaches' poll. The loss also dropped MSU to No. 7 in the CFP rankings. MSU's 40–21 victory over Maryland on November 13, coupled with Oklahoma's first loss of the season, moved the Spartans up to No. 7 in the AP poll and No. 8 in the Coaches' poll. Following a crushing 56–7 defeat at the hands of Ohio State, the 9–2 Spartans dropped to No. 12 in the AP poll and No. 13 in the Coaches' poll. MSU closed out the regular season with a 30–27 victory over Penn State, moving them up to No. 11 in the AP poll while remaining at No. 13 in the Coaches' poll. Michigan State reached 10 wins for the first time since 2017, and went undefeated at home (6–0) for the first time since 2015. The Spartans went on to defeat Pittsburgh in the Peach Bowl 31–21, marking MSU's first 11-win season since their Big 10 winning 2015 campaign. MSU finished the season ranked No. 8 in the Coaches Poll and No. 9 in the AP poll, the team's highest rankings since 2015.

On November 24, MSU and Tucker agreed to a 10-year, $95 million contract extension. This decision caused considerable surprise among college football observers, as Tucker had a career record of 16-14 at the time.

On November 30, Tucker won the Big Ten Coach of the Year awards, being named both the Hayes-Schembechler Coach of the Year (coaches' vote) and the Dave McClain Coach of the Year (media vote).

2022 season 
MSU began the 2022 season ranked in both the AP and Coaches' polls. But after opening the season with wins over Western Michigan and Akron, the Spartans lost their next four games, against Washington, Minnesota, Maryland and Ohio State, all by double-digit margins. After ending the losing streak with a double-overtime home win against Wisconsin, the Spartans again lost by double-digits, this time to Michigan. The season concluded with another double digit loss to Penn State and no bowl game for the second time in three years.

Head coaching record

NFL

* – Interim head coach

College

References

External links
 Michigan State profile
 Colorado profile

1972 births
Living people
African-American coaches of American football
African-American players of American football
American football defensive backs
Alabama Crimson Tide football coaches
Chicago Bears coaches
Cleveland Browns coaches
Colorado Buffaloes football coaches
Georgia Bulldogs football coaches
Jacksonville Jaguars head coaches
Jacksonville Jaguars coaches
LSU Tigers football coaches
Miami RedHawks football coaches
Michigan State Spartans football coaches
National Football League defensive coordinators
Ohio State Buckeyes football coaches
Players of American football from Cleveland
Sportspeople from Cleveland
Wisconsin Badgers football players
Cleveland Heights High School alumni
21st-century African-American sportspeople
20th-century African-American sportspeople